Petras Jonaitis Mantigirdaitis (died after 1497) was a prominent noble of the Grand Duchy of Lithuania. Grandson of Petras Mantigirdaitis, he first appeared in written sources in 1476 and reached his career high in the 1490s, when he was Voivode of Trakai (1490–97) and Grand Marshal of Lithuania (1491–97). 

Chronicler Marcin Bielski described that Alexander Jagiellon was crowned and blessed as the new Grand Duke of Lithuania by the Bishop of Vilnius in 1492. Then Mantigirdaitis presented Alexander with a naked sword and a reminder that Alexander was elected to be a just ruler. In 1494, Mantigirdaitis was sent on the diplomatic mission to negotiate peace with the Grand Duchy of Moscow and marriage of Helena of Moscow to Alexander to end the First Muscovite–Lithuanian War. 

Mantigirdaitis is mentioned as the first Great Hetman of Lithuania. The Bychowiec Chronicle describes how Grand Duke Alexander visited the ailing Mantigirdaitis in Trakai and asked for his recommendations for a successor. Mantigirdaitis recommended Konstantin Ostrogski. Mantigirdaitis is also mentioned as Hetman in a surviving copy of a donation document by Grand Duke Alexander that Vytas Jankauskas dated March 1494. If the date is correct, this would indicate that the Hetman position developed during the First Muscovite–Lithuanian War (1492–94).

Offices
Mantigirdaitis held the following offices:
 Starosta of Braslaw (1476–82) and Lutsk (1486–89)
 Marshal of Grand Duke (1480–82) and Volhynia (1487–89)
 Voivode of Trakai (1490–97)
 Grand Marshal of Lithuania (1491–97)
 Great Hetman of Lithuania (1494–97)

Family
There is no information available on his father, thus historians assume he died in his youth. Mantigirdaitis was married twice. His first wife was Anna, daughter of Jonas Vėževičius, regent of Smolensk. They had a son and a daughter. Their son Jonas died in the Battle of Vedrosha ending the family line. Their daughter Sophia married Stanisław Kiszka, who inherited the family's substantial wealth. In 1482, Anna funded the Chapel of Holy Trinity in Vilnius Cathedral. It is likely that Mantigirdaitis funded the Catholic church in Iwye, his most important estate.

References

1497 deaths
15th-century Lithuanian nobility
Year of birth unknown
Great Hetmans of the Grand Duchy of Lithuania
Grand Marshals of the Grand Duchy of Lithuania
Voivodes of Trakai